In algebra, the prime avoidance lemma says that if an ideal I in a commutative ring R is contained in a union of finitely many prime ideals Pi's, then it is contained in Pi for some i.

There are many variations of the lemma (cf. Hochster); for example, if the ring R contains an infinite field or a finite field of sufficiently large cardinality, then the statement follows from a fact in linear algebra that a vector space over an infinite field or a finite field of large cardinality is not a finite union of its proper vector subspaces.

Statement and proof 
The following statement and argument are perhaps the most standard.

Statement: Let E be a subset of R that is an additive subgroup of R and is multiplicatively closed. If E is not contained in any of 's, then E is not contained in the union .

Proof by induction on n: The idea is to find an element that is in E and not in any of 's. The basic case n = 1 is trivial. Next suppose n ≥ 2. For each i, choose

where the set on the right is nonempty by inductive hypothesis. We can assume  for all i; otherwise, some  avoids  all the 's and we are done. Put
.
Then z is in E but not in any of 's. If n is 2, we are done.

E. Davis' prime avoidance 
There is the following variant of prime avoidance due to E. Davis.

Proof: We argue by induction on r. Without loss of generality, we can assume there is no inclusion relation between the 's; since otherwise we can use the inductive hypothesis.

Also, if  for each i, then we are done; thus, without loss of generality, we can assume . By inductive hypothesis, we find a y in J such that . Otherwise, note that  (since ) and since  is a prime ideal, we have:
.
Then, since , the element  has the required property.

Application 
Let A be a Noetherian ring, I an ideal generated by n elements and M a finite A-module such that . Also, let  = the maximal length of M-regular sequences in I = the length of every maximal M-regular sequence in I. Then ; this estimate can be shown using the above prime avoidance as follows. We argue by induction on n. Let  be the set of associated primes of M. If , then  for each i. If , then, by prime avoidance, we can choose

The claim now follows.

Notes

References 
Mel Hochster, Dimension theory and systems of parameters, a supplementary note

Algebra